Kevin Robert Kunnert (born November 11, 1951) is a retired American basketball player in the National Basketball Association (NBA). A 7'0" and 230 lb center–forward, was drafted out of the University of Iowa by the Chicago Bulls in the first round (12th overall) of the 1973 NBA draft. He also helped the Houston Rockets to a Central Division title during the 1976–77 season.

Early life
Kunnert was born in Dubuque, Iowa as one of 10 children and graduated from Dubuque Wahlert High School in 1969. Kunnert lead Wahlert to a third-place finish in the Iowa High School State Basketball Tournament as a senior.

College
Kunnert attended the University of Iowa, where he scored 1,145 career points, and was the Hawkeyes' all-time leading rebounder at  the time of his graduation. Kunnert led the Big Ten in rebounding and field goal percentage his senior year, averaging 19.2 points and 13.9 rebounds on 54.5% shooting. He averaged  18.2  points and 14.7 rebounds as a junior in 1971-1972. For his career he averaged 15.9 points and 12.7 rebounds for the Hawkeyes under Coach Dick Schultz, after being recruited to Iowa by Ralph Miller.

NBA career
Kunnert was the 12th overall selection in the First Round of the 1973 NBA draft by the Chicago Bulls. In September, 1973 Kunnert was traded by the Bulls to the Buffalo Braves with Gar Heard for John Hummer and two draft picks.

Kunnert played nine seasons in the NBA for the Buffalo Braves (1973-1974), Houston Rockets  (1973-1978), San Diego Clippers (1978-1979), and the Portland Trail Blazers (1979-1982), reaching the NBA playoffs three times.

For his career he averaged 8.3 points, 7.3 rebounds and 1.1 blocks per game. His best season was with the Rockets in  1975-1976, when he averaged 12.9 points and 9.8 rebounds.

The Washington Punch
An unfortunate incident occurred on December 9, 1977. Kunnert, playing for the Rockets and Kermit Washington of the Los Angeles Lakers got into a tussle after a missed shot. Kareem Abdul-Jabbar of the Lakers joined in and Kunnert went to one knee on the court in the skirmish. His teammate Rudy Tomjanovich, rushing towards the players, was punched by Washington, sending him down, where he struck his head on the court. Tomjanovich suffered a fractured skull, broken jaw, broken nose, facial injuries and leakage of spinal fluid in the incident. Washington was suspended 60 days and fined $10,000.

Honors
Kunnert was a Two-time team Most Valuable Player for the Hawkeyes, in 1972 and 1973.

Kunnert was inducted into the Dubuque Wahlert Athletic Hall of Fame in 2018.

Kunnert was selected in the Top University of Iowa All-Time Players.

Personal life
Kunnert resided in the Portland area, Tigard, Oregon after retiring from the NBA. He has three daughters and met his wife while both were students at Iowa.

References

External links
Career stats at basketball-reference.com
Iowa Men's Basketball 1,000 Point Club - Kevin Kunnert's college statistics (involves scrolling down)

1951 births
Living people
American men's basketball players
Basketball players from Iowa
Buffalo Braves players
Centers (basketball)
Chicago Bulls draft picks
Houston Rockets players
Iowa Hawkeyes men's basketball players
People from Dubuque, Iowa
Portland Trail Blazers players
Power forwards (basketball)
San Diego Clippers players
People from Tigard, Oregon